The Wright-Bellanca WB-1 was designed by Giuseppe Mario Bellanca for the Wright Aeronautical corporation for use in record-breaking flights.

Development
The WB-1 was a high-winged monoplane with conventional landing gear and all-wood construction. The landing gear fairings were constructed to extend into wheel pants.

Operational history
The WB-1 was demonstrated at the 1925 Pulitzer Prize Air Races in New York. In the first day's flights, the WB-1 clocked in 121.8 mph in a closed course race. On day two, the WB-1 won, in a payload versus hp and speed efficiency contest, beating a Curtiss Oriole and Sikorsky S-31. In 1926, pilot Fred Becker crashed the overloaded aircraft in a world-record endurance attempt. The aircraft cartwheeled and broke up on a landing attempt.

Specifications (WB-1)

See also

References

External links
San Diego Air & Space Museum Archives

Wright aircraft